The Jeanneau Metaf is a French sailing dinghy that was designed as a day sailer and  cruiser and first built in 1972.

Production
The design was built by Jeanneau in France in the United States, starting in 1972, but it is now out of production.

Design
The Metaf is a recreational sailboat, built predominantly of fiberglass, with wood trim. It has a fractional sloop rig, with a keel-stepped mast and aluminum spars with stainless steel wire rigging. The hull has a raked stem, a slightly angled transom, a transom-hung rudder controlled by a tiller and a retractable centerboard. It displaces .

The design has sleeping accommodation for two people, with a double "V"-berth in the cabin.

See also
List of sailing boat types

References

External links

Dinghies
1970s sailboat type designs
Sailboat types built by Jeanneau